The Timurid invasion of Simsim was a military conflict in the last quarter of the 14th century to the early 1430s between the Timurid Empire and the Princedom of Simsim, today located on the territory of modern day Chechnya and Ingushetia. Due to Simsim's involvement in the Tokhtamysh–Timur war, Timur invaded and devastated the country forcing the population to flee into the highlands. The resistance continued however and after a series of successful counter-campaigns conducted by Surakat, the Timurids withdrew from the region. The conflict ended in a failure of the Timurid Empire to subjugate the people nor being able to completely conquer the highlands. The Avakhar (Aukh) also took part in this conflict, first while fighting against the ally of Simsim, the Golden Horde, with the support of Timur, but then later went on to show support to their southern neighbor, thus also participating in a war against the Timurid Empire.

Insurgency in Aukh
Unlike its southern neighbor, the people of Aukh, known as "Ovkhoy" in Chechen and "Avakhar" in the chronicle Zafarnama, waged a brutal war against the Golden Horde. This war took place in the last quarter of the 14th century and consisted of five major battles. Due to the weakened status of the Golden Horde and the threat of Timur, Tokhtamysh could not focus on the "Avakhar" and withdrew. 

Yanbek, a commander from the Akkiy Teip of Chechnya, was elected the leader of the uprising. In the first two battles, the Battle of the Terek River and the Battle of Amarka, the Avakhar, led by Yanbek, successfully defeated the forces of the Golden Horde. During the third battle, however, the most brutal one according to Amin Anguni, the Battle of Keshn'e, the Chechen forces were almost defeated. During the battle, the Gazikumukh Shamkhalate, also opposers of the Golden Horde, came to help the Avakhar in their struggle. The tide of the battle was turned, with approximately 3,000 Mongol soldiers being killed. Yanbek however was also killed during the battle, and was succeeded by his son Ma'adiy, who continued the insurgency. Today, the mountains in Aukh are called "Yanbeka lamnash", meaning "Yanbek's mountains".Almost nothing is known about the fourth battle, but there is a historical reference to the fifth and final battle, the Battle of Dylym.

Before the Battle of Dylym took place, Timur, who prepared for an invasion of the Golden Horde, sent a "Rasul" (messenger) to Ma'adiy, expressing support for the Avakhar struggle against the Golden Horde. The allied forces of Aukh, Gazikumukh Shamkhalate and the Timurid Empire came out victorious, defeating the Golden Horde, after which the Mongols withdrew from the region, granting the Avakhar their independence. Despite Simsim's and Golden Horde's allied relations, the Avakhar did end up supporting their southern neighbor Simsim.
The first four battles are more of a legendary event, however the fifth battle is mentioned in Zafarnama.

First Timurid invasion
Between the years 1386 and 1394, Timur conducted several expeditions in the Caucasus, mainly Georgia.

In 1394, the Georgian monarch George VII prepared a Georgian-mountaineer militia (mainly Vainakh) and organized defensive operations in case of another Timurid campaign.

At first, the combined militia of Georgian and Nakh fighters turned out to be successful, even managing to push back parts of Timur's army. However, Timur's forces defeated the militia in the end. One part of the army fled north-to the Darial Gorge, and due to its strategical importance, Timur decided to hunt the army down and occupy the gorge. However, when the Timurid army arrived there, mountaineer fighters attacked the Timurid army from all sides, confusing and disorganizing them. Timur retreated his forces shortly after.

Tokhtamysh-Timur war

Background and Battle of the Kondurcha River

During the Tokhtamysh-Timur war (1386-1395), the Princedom of Simsim as well as other Caucasian tribes actively took part in the conflict on the side of the Golden Horde. During the Battle of the Kondurcha River in 1392, there were many Vainakh, Circassian and other Caucasian  volunteers taking part on the side of Tokhtamysh. However, the forces of Tokhtamysh were defeated, severely weakening the Golden Horde, and Tokhtamysh did manage restore it's former strength.

Battle of the Terek River

In of April 1395, after a series of raids conducted by Tokhtamysh on territory of Shirvan, today's Azerbaijan, Timur decided to invade the Golden Horde. Among the commanders of the army of Tokhtamysh were Khour II, also known by the names "Khour Ela" or "Gayur Khan", as well as Vazaar, a high ranking military commander, from the city Sarai. His son Azdin, a Chechen theologian and traveller in the 14th century, recorded the story of his father and also claimed to be from the "Alan tribe of Nakhcho". Although Azdin did not mention what happened to Vazaar after the Battle of the Terek River.

On the 14th of April 1395, the two sides were opposites of the Terek River. During the night, Timur and his army managed to successfully trick Tokhtamysh by sending a large group of civilians to continue marching along the Terek River, while Timur and his army marched the opposite way and eventually crossed the River and set up a camp.  

On the first day, Tokhtamysh ordered his right flank, made up of horse archers, to attack Timur's left Rear guard. Timur countered by ordering his left flank to assist the rear guard, forcing Tokhtamysh's army back. However, Timur's left continued pushing Tokhtamysh's right, after which Tokhtamysh sent his cavalry to encircle Timur's left, almost destroying it. This forced Timur to retreat back into his camp, with him almost being captured. Timur's army went into a defensive position and quickly reorganized, which again forced Tokhtamysh's army back. 

On the second day, Tokhtamysh sent his left flank to destroy Timur's right flank. It got pushed back, after which it formed a defensive shield-wall position. Behind the wall of shields, Timur's right shot arrows at the approaching Mongol army. This forced them back. At the end of the second day, Timur sent a messenger to the emirs of Tokhtamysh's left, in which Timur, promised the Emir Aktau gifts if he left the battlefield, which he did, taking with him an army of 10,000, which left the remaining army in confusion.

On the third day, Tokhtamysh ordered a full frontal-assault on the army of Timur, while putting pressure on the weakened right flank of Timur. However, before the battle started, Timur heavily reinforced his right flank. This resulted in the failure of Tokhtamysh's left flank to push back Timur's right. Tokhtamysh realized to late, and when he and a part of the main army went to help his left flank, his main army got destroyed, followed by his left flank. He did however have an escape plan prepared, in which he sent his right and largely unharmed flank in to the Caucasus, which would be persecuted by Timur's army, giving him time to escape. The plan worked, however Tokhtamysh's right flank was destroyed. 

At the end of the battle, both sides had lost around 100,000 men, although the casualties of the Golden Horde were significantly higher. Despite his successful escape, Tokhtamysh was not able to gather a new army, so he fled to the Grand Duchy of Lithuania, ending his reign.

Main Timurid invasion

Background
As a result of the North Caucasian involvement in the Tokhtamysh-Timur war, Timur, now with his army of around 200,000, invaded and devastated the region. He first marched far west, reaching Circassia. After having rested there for a time, he sent an army under the command of Muhammad Sultan to Circassia to destroy it.

Timur then went west, reaching the Kingdom of Buriberd, which was ruled by Nakh king Burak Khan. Timur led the campaign against Buriberd. Having reached the kingdom, he marched south, burning down forests, until he eventually reached the mountains. Here, most of the fighting took place. Slowly capturing fortresses, Timur burned the "Enemies of the faith", despite Islam's prohibition to burn war captives. The Emir continued, burning down several villages on the way, although the chronicle does not state whether Burak Khan was captured or killed. After the campaign, Timur went back to his head quarters in Ghizba and arranged a feast. 

After his short rest, Timur continued his expedition and reached the lands ruled by the brothers Kuli and T'ausa, who each owned their own fortress, serving as a capital. Apparently, the walls of these two fortresses were so high that "Not even the arrows shot from a bow could reach it". While trying to capture the fortresses, the Timurids suffered heavy casualties. In the end however, the inhabitants of Kuli and T'ausa's land could not hold back the pressure and eventually, fell to the hands of Timur. As a result, the people of both fortresses were rotten out.

From there, Timur went to the fortress "Pulada", where one of Tokhtamysh's Emir, Uturku, was hiding. Timur issued an ultimatum to the ruler of the land, a Nakh king by the name Pul Adi. The letter said: "Send (us) Uturka, who has taken refuge with you, if not, then I will come with an uncountable army, which all consists of lions." To this, Pul Adi replied: "I have a well defended fortress and the means for war are prepared; Uturku has taken refuge with me, and as long as (I have) my soul, I will not give him away, and as long as I can, i will protect him."

Enraged, Timur ordered the burning of the forests surrounding the fortress. A fierce battle began. Timur's victory was not simple, due to the fortress being located in a mountain gorge, where numerical superiority meant nothing. During the battle, Uturka managed to flee to Abkhazia, while the inhabitants of the fortress, managed to escape, and took up defensive positions on the mountain side.

The hunt for Uturka continued, Timur went through Abkhazia, in which he occupied the fortress Kabchigai. But soon after, Timur returned to his headquarters, to reorganize his troops and to plan a large campaign against the Princedom of Simsim.

Prelude
The chronicle Zafarnama does not talk about the fate of Khour II, while Chechen legends differ as to what happened to him. According to Tesayev, Khour II survived the invasion but later died during a feudal strive, while Amin Anguni gives a completely different version on his death.

According to Amin Anguni, after the fall of the fortress Pulada, the son of Khour II, Makham, called Muhammad in Zafarnama, met Timur for negotiations. Makham, a Muslim, rejected his fathers support for Tokhtamysh, since the latter was interested in steppe statehood, while Timur claimed to be a fighter for the Islamic faith. Enraged, Timur told Makham that he would not touch Simsim if Khour II, by then an aged man, came to his headquarters, kneeled before him and asked for mercy. Khour did eventually meet Timur and was ready to humiliate himself. Timur made a long mockery of him, and then executed him, because he was afraid of letting him live, especially since Simsim owned the Darial pass and the "Gates of Dzurdzuk" (Assa Gorge). Saddened by his fathers death, Makham, despite his support for Timur, returned to Simsim and led the resistance. However the most prominent belief about Khour II's fate is that he died much later.

Coincidentally, this is a common belief in Chechen folklore, as many of them speak of a treacherous execution of Khour II while trying to negotiate with Timur.

Start of the Timur's campaign
Having won several clashes with the Simsir army, Timur occupied the land north of the Terek river. While moving along the left bank of the Terek River, Timur advanced south, crossing the Sunzha River, after which fierce fighting took place for a densely populated town today not far away from Gudermes, ending in a victory for Timurids and the destruction of the town. 

After having passed and occupied the Khankala gorge, located in the south-east of today's Grozny, Timur's forces met with the forces of Khour II, and a brutal battle followed. During the battle, Khour noticed the size of the army, afterwhich he retreated his forces into the mountains, which also led to the mass amounts of losses in his army. The lost battle of Khankala is also the most prominent version for the reason behind Makham's surrender in Chechen folklore, while Zafarnama doesn't derictly state the reason behind his surrender, only that he "obeyed and came with his people to serve, displayed servile obedience."

After Simsim's retreat, Timur's army made their way to Mt. Suyra-Korta (old Chechen "Military peak"), where they established their new headquarters, "Khromets". From there, he sent an army through the Shali route, which eventually reached the village Elistanzhiy, and then the Cheberla region (south-east Chechnya), which was subsequently plundered, devastated and occupied. The second army, led by Timur, went in a south western direction, fighting itself through Nokhchiy-Are, a region located south of the Sunzha River. 

After a while of constant fighting, Timur gave the order to destroy Maghas, which was rebuilt after the Mongol invasions of the 13th century. The destruction of Maghas marked the beginning of the mass migration of Durdzuks into the mountains, and, according to Amin Anguni, the destruction of Maghas was the reason behind Makham's surrender. After having destroyed the city, Timur pushed the Simsim army south, until they eventually retreated, opening Timur the way to the Argun gorge.

Battle of Shotoy and the Argun Gorge
As Timur began approaching the Argun Gorge, the inhabitants alarmed the "Mekhk-Khel" (National Council) of Timur's advance through a signal of combat towers stretching from Argun to western Chechnya. In the Argun Gorge, near today's Shotoy village a commander (Tur-Da) by the name Kahlo took control over the Argun forces. He successfully managed to hold back Timur's troops in Shotoy, while also managing to alarm the rest of Simsir about Timur's advance. Having heard of Timur's advance, the Mekhk-Khel moved the capital to a geographical inaccessible region, the Malkhista region.

Slowly, armies from all across Simsim began arriving in the Argun Gorge. The first one, an army from the Zumsoy region led by Irgid came to help the people of Argun. According to folktale, the exhausted and wounded Kahlo gave Irdig his sword, telling him "This sword shall remain in battle until every enemy is slain". Despite their struggles, the Battle of Shotoy was won by Timurid forces, ending the "Organa ch'ozham lettam" (opposition in the Argun Gorge), however fighting still continued in the lower reaches of the river. According to popular Chechen folklore, after the Battle of Shotoy, Timur gifted his sabre to Irdig as a sign of respect. (For more see folklore in aftermath section)

Mammach of the Ch'antiy clan of Chechnya, allied with Timur and accompanied him in later campaigns.

Timur's advance in the mountains
After the retreat of Chechen forces after the Battle of Shotoy, Timur continued his campaigns into the mountains, destroying churches and religious temples on the way. He captured the settlements Nikhaloy, Guchan-Kkhala and others. While doing so, he devastated the regions Itum-K'alinsky, Sharoysky and Shotoysky, until he reached the fortress "Gucha". The forces of Timur tried taking the fortress by storm several times, but failed. Because of this, the fortress was called "Khanat-Kkhala", coming from the Turkic language meaning "Winged fortress".

After being unable to conquer the fortress, Timur advanced north, capturing the settlement Kharachoy, until he turned around, eventually reaching the Sharo-Argun Gorge, which he occupied. He then captured the settlements Keloy, followed by Sharo-Argun, then D'ai, until he slowly advanced on the fortress K'im. After having heard of the news, the Mekhk-Khel announced a decree, saying "Let's fight, crying like a she-wolf (protecting her offspring), and we will no longer let the enemy move forward one step!" Thus, the people's militia was given one task: Halt Timur's advance, or lose their lives while trying to do so.

It was here in K'im, where Timur's advance was halted. He eventally also signed a truce with the people of Argun. After having signed the truce, Timur returned to his headquarters in Mt. Syra-Korta and prepared for the most brutal campaign of the invasion yet: The invasion of Nokhch-Mokhk.

Invasion of Nokhch-Mokhk
Unlike the Argun gorge, the region Nokhch-Mokhk, in eastern Chechnya, did not have natural defenses such as rugged terrain, although it was home to huge dense forests, allowing Chechen forces to conduct a guerilla campaign. As soon as the people of Nokhch-Mokhk heard of the arrival of the Timurids, they used improvised materials for the construction of battle towers (see Vainakh tower architecture). 

Timur, having entered Nokhch-Mokhk, set up his new headquarters not far from the today's village Engel-Yurt. From there, he marched on the capital of Nokhch-Mokhk, Ghaliyt'a, destroying it. Just like in Argun, there were signal towers allowing the Chechens to better coordinate their attacks, significantlly hampering the advance of Timur's troops. Therefore, Timur focused on destroying these signaling towers, which he succeeded in. This is said in Zafarnama about Timur's anger while invading Nokhch-Mokhk: "The residents of the area were tied up by Timur's orders and thrown from the mountain." According to popular Chechen legends, (see also Nart saga and "cultural effects" section) the Narts, a legendary tribe inhabiting the North Caucasus, single handedly defended their houses with a shield, sword and mace. Timur's campaign also continued into mountainous  Dagestan, until he withdrew from the region, preparing for a campaign in Aukh.

After a brutal fight, Timur eventually succeeded in conquering Nokhch-Mokhk. The remaining resistance fighters, mainly the Gendargenoy, Gunoy, Biltoy, Benoy and I'alaroy clans of east Chechnya fled Nokhch-Mokhk through the neighboring Cheberla region into Nashkh, a small region in western Chechnya, where they regrouped and rearmed.

Campaign in Aukh
In retrubution to their recent support for Princedom of Simsim, Timur invaded and plundered the region Aukh, called "Avakhar" in Zafarnama. In there, it is written, "afterwards, (after the invasion of Nokhch-Mokhk) the conqueror went to the mountain Avakhar, disturbed the local ulus and took much property".

According to Chechen legends, in midst of the battle, an ambassador of the Gazikumukh Shamkhalate by the name Shovkhal came to Aukh and said "You people of Aukh, if you are Muslim, tell us what war you are fighting and who you are fighting against". The Avakhar replied by saying "We are Muslim, alhamdulillah, but we are inferior in weapons." Shovkhal said "For now, use your arrows", before going back. The Avakhar made use of that advice and did so as he said, raining down arrows on the enemy. This greatly halted their advance, and with the arrival of the Kumykh forces, the Timurid army was pushed back and eventually forced to retreat. 

Following his campaign in Aukh, in October of 1395, Timur invaded Simsir's most populated city, Almak, which was made up of around 7,000-8,000 households. After fierce resistance, Timur captured the city and destroyed it.

Campaign in mountainous Dagestan
In winter of 1395, Timur undertook a campaign in today's Dagestan. After a short rest, Timur made his way to the town Tarki, next to which were also the villages Kadar and Durgeli. Previously, the Avakhar under Ma'adiy and the Gazikumukh Shamkhalate under Shovkhal waged Jihad several times in this region, but despite this, the two allies, together with an army numbering around 3,000 men, travelled to their help.

Timur had already heard of the approach of Ma'adiy and Shovkhal, so he directly met them in an unknown location. A fierce battle ensued, in which the forces of the allies were defeated. Shovkhal was also killed during the battle, and his head was later brought to Timur. There, he said to the supporters of Aukh and the Shamkhalate "Before, you, the adherents of Islam, always fought with the infidels, what has become now, that you, stepping back from this, went to their aid?". Their supporters and war prisonors admitted their guilt and Timur vowed not to attack again and call on their people to do the same, for which they received gifts and for which the war captives were released, under the condition that they keep fighting "The enemies of the faith". Then the nobles and rulers of both the Gazikumukh Shamkhalate and Aukh came to Timur and recognized his rule, who in turn gifted them riches again. 

Following his victory, Timur expeditioned across mountainous Dagestan, destroying the fortresses Nerges, Mika, Balu and Derkelu while doing so. Then he invaded the Tsakhur Khanate, a Lezgin state that, according to Anguni, provided the most brutal resistance to Timur in Dagestan. By using their dense forests, the Lezgins inflicted such huge losses on the Timurid army that they "Forced the Timurids to retreat."

After his invasion of the Tsakhur Khanate, Timur invaded, ravaged and destroyed the Avar Khanate, which was ruled by the brother of Khour II, Surakat, called Surak Khan in Zafarnama. Timur expelled the Surakh dynasty from power, forcing Surakat to flee Avaria. Together with his son, Bayr, called Bayar in Zafarnama, Surakat fled to Simsim with a caravan containing weapons and riches and his remaining army, and worked on re-establishing his power. (See below)

Fate of Makham
The chronicle Zafarnama , just like with Khour II, does not give any information as to how Makham died. Chechen folklore speak of an assassination from Chechen mountaineers, but as to what happened after also heavily differs. According to one version, after Makham's assassination, the still resisting Khour was put into power again, while in others, the Chechens remained without a leader and resisted Timur on their own. According to the first version, Khour II was treacherously killed by the Timurids when trying to negotiate, approximately in 1396.

Surakats counter campaign
During the Timurid invasion of the Avar Khanate, Surakat, the brother of Khour II, called Surak Khan in Zafarnama , was defeated, and the land he ruled over, destroyed. Having heard the death of his brother, Khour II, Surakat together with his son Bayr, called Bayar in Zafarnama, fled to Princedom of Simsim with a caravan containing weapons and riches and his remaining army, where he re-established his power. His residence was in the Kirda fortress, thus making it the new capital. Sources call Surakat the last king of Simsim.

During the same year, in Tusheti, Kingdom of Georgia, he established the Parsma settlement, which served as a meeting place for discussing further actions against the Timurids in Simsim. These activities were carried out within the framework of the Vainakh-Georgian union. Combined, the forces of the Kingdom of Georgia and the Princedom of Simsim carried out several successful operations in the mountains of today's Chechnya, although it is important to note that Timur had already left the North Caucasus, leaving only garrisons of his army in the mountainous region behind. After a while, most Timurid garrisons were destroyed by the Chechen-Georgian armies, after which the Surakat family left Kirda and eventually settled in Sado-upper Cheberla. The last Timurid garrison "Khan Kkhala" ("The Khan's fortress") was ousted by the son of Surakat, Sark on the Kerket pass, south eastern Chechnya.

Invasion of Shirvanshah
After the successful counter-campaign conducted by the allied forces of Princedom of Simsim and the Kingdom of Georgia between 1396-1398, both sides launched a joint invasion of Shirvanshah, with the aim of expelling the pro-Timurid dynasty Darbandi as well as re-establish Chechen rule in Khunzakh. The campaign went successful at first, until Timur conducted a counteroffensive against the allies a year later in 1399, resulting in the third Timurid invasion of Simsim a year later in 1400 (see Raid against Georgia and the mountaineers).

However, with the death of Timur in 1405, the campaign in Shirvanshah continued, where it was then shortly disturbed by the Turkoman invasions of Georgia in 1412, during which the Kingdom of Georgia and the Princedom of Simsim signed a ceasefire agreement with Shirvanshah in order to defeat the invaders.

In the early 1430s, one final large campaign was carried out by Surakat and Alexander Iagainst Shirvan, which ended in a success for the allies, severely weakening the Darbandi dynasty, as well the recapture of Khunzakh.

Raid against Georgia and the mountaineers
Unhappy with the results and the counter-campaign conducted by Surakat, as well as the rapid advance of Simsim-Georgian troops in Shirvanshah, Timur conducted a counter-offensive against the allies in Kakheti and Hereti in 1399 to save the Darbandy dynasty. This campaign did not last long however, as snowfall began not long after. Timur withdrew his forces to Karabakh, where they rested for several months. The following year, in 1400, Timur conducted another offensive in the mountains of Georgia and Simsim, however, after being unable to penetrate into the mountains, Timur retreated to south and devastated the region Kartli. George VII, who fled to Imereti, managed to reach a temporary peace agreement with Timur. However, only a year later in 1401 as well as 1403, Timur continued conducting raids, although this time they were mainly aimed at the Kingdom of Georgia.

Aftermath
The physical, material and cultural losses of the Vainakh people were so great that the 
historical link of times and cultures was once again broken. Overcrowding and lack of 
arable land caused the Chechens to devise methods to adapt to their new situation, 
including terracing plots of land and covering them with soil.

Collapse of Simsim
With the death of Khour II and the invasion of Timur, the Princedom of Simsim was mostly destroyed. Under Surakat, the state continued to live for another 30 years, before it eventually collapsed with the death of Surakat in the early 1430s.

Land disputes with their neighbors
The Vainakh returned to the lowlands in the 15th century after they were forced to the highlands during the Mongol and Timurid invasions. Upon settling in the lowlands, the Vainakh clashed with the Kabardian and Kumyk feudal lords who sought to rule over the plains. As a result, the feudal lords subjected several Vainakh communities to their rule and forced them to pay tribute to them in the form of sheep or other livestock. However, not all of them were subdued, the rest continued to resist, and eventually, over a long period of time  (up until the 18th century), the Vainakh emerged victorious under the leaders such as Zok-K'ant, Tinavin Visa and Aldaman Gheza.Thus, having made themselves free from the rule of the Kabardian and Kumyk lords, the Chechens banished their own feudal lords as well and began to live again united in free communities (societies). The Vainakhs have a saying: ”When one is voted a prince (ela) the others become their slaves”, which apparently dates back to that time. - George Anchabadze, The Vainakhs: Chechen and Ingush, p.27

Folklore
In Nakh folklore, there are several legends regarding the invasion of Timur. The most popular being the "sword of reconciliation", which states that after the Battle of Shotoy, Timur gifted his sword to Irdig as a sign of respect for the Chechens' resistance.

Similar stories claim that Timur gifted the Chechen people gold and other riches, which the Chechen elders of today claim to have been stolen during the deportation of the Chechens and Ingush.

Another popular story, is after a battle, which ended in a Timurid victory, only one man survived, a singer, who motivated the Chechen fighters through his music. He was captured and taken to Timur, who asked him, "Is anyone still alive?", to which the man replied "No". "Have they all died?", asked Timur, to which he responded "Yes", "And how did you survive?" "I could not hold the blade in my hands during the battle, i fell, and they twisted me, otherwise i would've died together with everyone." Amazed by the courage of the Chechen people, Timur let him go.

See also
Khour II
Princedom of Simsim
Tokhtamysh-Timur war
Battle of the Terek River
Chechen-Kazikumukh war
Surakat
Mongol invasions of Durdzuketi

References

Wars involving Chechnya
14th-century conflicts
15th-century conflicts
Battles of Timur
Military history of the Timurid Empire